Sidney Wood was declared winner of the title by default over Frank Shields in capturing the gentlemen's singles tennis title at the 1931 Wimbledon Championships. Shields withdrew due to a knee injury sustained during his semifinal match against Jean Borotra. This made Wood the only player in the title's history to win without having to compete in the final. Bill Tilden was the defending champion, but did not compete.

Seeds 

  Jean Borotra (semifinals)
  Henri Cochet (first round)
  Frank Shields (final)
  Christian Boussus (fourth round)
  Fred Perry (semifinals)
  Bunny Austin (quarterfinals)
  Sidney Wood (champion)
  Jiro Sato (quarterfinals)

Draw

Finals

Top half

Section 1

Section 2

Section 3

Section 4

Bottom half

Section 5

Section 6

Section 7

Section 8

References

External links

Men's Singles
Wimbledon Championship by year – Men's singles